The current administrative division of Latvia came into force on 1 July 2021. 

On 10 June 2020, the Saeima approved a municipal reform that would reduce the 110 municipalities and nine republic cities to 43 local government units consisting of 36 municipalities (novadi) and seven state cities (valstspilsētas, plural). On 1 June 2021, the Constitutional Court of Latvia ruled that the annexation of Varakļāni Municipality to Rēzekne Municipality was unconstitutional. In response, the Saeima decided to preserve the existence of Varakļāni Municipality as a 43rd local government unit.

Previous municipal reforms after the restoration of Latvian independence were enacted in 2009 and 1990 (when parishes were restored).

State cities with independent governments as of 2021

The 2020 law on administrative territories and populated areas designated Ogre and the previous nine republic cities as state cities. It also provided for the promotion of Iecava and Koknese to state city status on 1 July 2021. However, under the same law, only the seven state cities listed in the following table will have local governments which are independent of any municipality. The state cities of Jēkabpils and Valmiera became part of Jēkabpils Municipality and Valmiera Municipality respectively on 1 July 2021.

Municipalities as of 2021
As of 1 July 2021, there are 36 municipalities in Latvia:

See also 
 Administrative divisions of Latvia before 2021
 Administrative divisions of Latvia before 2009

References 

 
Latvia
Latvia
Latvia geography-related lists
2021 establishments in Latvia
States and territories established in 2021
Latvia